The 1999–2000 Highland Football League was won by Keith. Fort William finished bottom.

Table

Highland Football League seasons
5
Scot